Nikos Vasiliou (Greek: Νίκος Βασιλείου; born 1 April 1977) is a Greek footballer who currently plays for Thrasyvoulos F.C. in the Greek Beta Ethniki.

Vasiliou played in the Greek Super League during the 2008–09 season.

References

1977 births
Living people
Greek footballers
Thrasyvoulos F.C. players
Association footballers not categorized by position